RV Inn Style Resorts Amphitheater, formerly known as the Sleep Country Amphitheater, Amphitheater Northwest, and the Sunlight Supply Amphitheater (originally The Amphitheater at Clark County and commonly Clark County Amphitheater), is an 18,000-seat capacity amphitheater, located in Ridgefield, Washington.

It is the largest outdoor amphitheater in the Portland metropolitan area. It is used for concerts, stage shows and other special events, including the Clark County Fair. Construction started in 2002, with Sustaita Architects designing the venue and Hoffman Construction Company building it.

History
After its opening in 2003, it operated at a $1 million to $3 million loss through 2008. On July 10, 2009, Coldplay became the first music act to sell out the venue. The Amphitheater at Clark County was renamed Sleep Country Amphitheater in March 2010 after the parent company of Sleep Country USA acquired the naming rights, initially for three years. That contract having expired (and not been renewed), the facility was renamed Amphitheater Northwest in January 2015.  This name ended up being temporary, as the venue's owners were reported to be seeking a new sponsor. In October, they did so, and the venue was renamed Sunlight Supply Amphitheater. In August 2021, the venue was renamed after new sponsor, RV Inn Style Resorts.

Events

See also
List of contemporary amphitheatres

References

External links
Official website

Amphitheaters in the United States
Music venues in Washington (state)
Theatres in Washington (state)
Buildings and structures in Clark County, Washington
Tourist attractions in Clark County, Washington